The Screen Stockport Film Festival was a film festival held annually at the Stockport Plaza, Stockport, England, in which short and feature films made locally nationally and internationally are entered. It is considered the main film festival for North West England.
It was founded in 2011. They are six categories of films and several awards for roles in films as well as the type of film.

Every year the festival has special guests. Previous guests include.
 Phil Hawkins
 Col Needham
 Mark Herbert
 Carol Morley

The event is sponsored by the IMDb, and Col Needham, the founder of the company, was a guest speaker in 2012.

References

Stockport
Film festivals in Greater Manchester
Defunct film festivals in the United Kingdom